|}

The March Stakes is a flat horse race in Great Britain open to horses aged three years. It is run at Goodwood over a distance of 1 mile and 6 furlongs (2,816 metres), and it is scheduled to take place each year in late August.

History
The event is named after the Earldom of March, a title inherited by the eldest son of the Duke of Richmond, the owner of Goodwood Racecourse. It was established when a new fixture was introduced at the venue in 1965.

The race was originally restricted to three-year-olds, and it was formerly a leading trial for the St. Leger Stakes. The first horse to achieve victory in both events was Commanche Run in 1984, and the latest was Michelozzo in 1989.

The March Stakes was opened to older horses in 1999 and closed to them again from 2017. In 2018 it was upgraded to Group 3 status as part of the European Pattern Committee's commitment to improving the race programme for stayers in Europe. The race lost its Group 3 status when it was removed from the Pattern and Listed race programme in 2023.

Since 2018 the race has been run in memory of John Dunlop (1939-2018), a racehorse trainer who trained at Arundel, near Goodwood.

Records
Most successful horse (2 wins):
 First Charter – 2002, 2003
 Tungsten Strike – 2007, 2008

Leading jockey (4 wins):
 Willie Carson – Water Mill (1980), Band (1983), Jahafil (1991), Rain Rider (1992)

Leading trainer (7 wins):
 Sir Michael Stoute – Zaffaran (1988), Shaiba (1993), Ta-Lim (1998), Alva Glen (2000), First Charter (2002, 2003), Platitude (2016)

Winners

See also
 Horse racing in Great Britain
 List of British flat horse races

References

 Racing Post:

horseracingintfed.com – International Federation of Horseracing Authorities – March Stakes (2018).
 pedigreequery.com – March Stakes – Goodwood.

Flat races in Great Britain
Goodwood Racecourse
Flat horse races for three-year-olds
Recurring sporting events established in 1965
1965 establishments in England